The Bathurst 1000 (formally known as the Repco Bathurst 1000) is a  touring car race held annually on the Mount Panorama Circuit in Bathurst, New South Wales, Australia. It is currently run as part of the Supercars Championship, the most recent incarnation of the Australian Touring Car Championship. In 1987 it was a round of the World Touring Car Championship. The Bathurst 1000 is colloquially known as The Great Race among motorsport fans and media. The race concept originated with the 1960 Armstrong 500 at the Phillip Island Grand Prix Circuit, before being relocated to Bathurst in 1963 and continuing there in every year since. The race was traditionally run on the Labour Day long weekend in New South Wales, in early October. Since 2001, the race is run on the weekend after the long weekend, normally the second weekend in October.

Race winners are presented with the Peter Brock Trophy. This trophy was introduced at the 2006 race to commemorate the death of Peter Brock. Brock is the most successful driver in the history of the race, winning the event nine times, and was also known as one of the most popular and fan-friendly drivers during his long career. He was given the moniker "King of the Mountain" for these reasons.

Mount Panorama

The Mount Panorama Circuit was first used on 16 April 1938 for the Australian Tourist Trophy meeting for motorcycles, followed two days later by the Australian Grand Prix for cars. The track uses temporarily-closed-public roads and is known for the  elevation difference between its highest and lowest points. The first turn, Hell Corner, is a ninety-degree left-hander. A complex corner called Reid Park comes next, where a number of drivers have spun after not short shifting at the apex. The course continues down to Sulman Park and McPhillamy Park. Drivers are unable to see the descending road and enter Skyline and the first of The Esses at  before The Dipper, one of the most famous corners in Australian motorsport. Cars then negotiate Forrest's Elbow before powering down Conrod Straight, the fastest section of the track where cars can reach . Murray's is the 23rd and final turn, and also the slowest part of the circuit, before cars return to the start-finish straight. The start-finish straight features an offset start, with the finish line towards the back of the starting grid closer to Murray's Corner.

Spectator areas have spread along the track over the decades but there are a number of private properties bordering the track so spectators are unable to access all trackside vantage points. Spectator vantage points have also become less intimate to the track over recent years, with increased run-off size and debris fencing being installed around the track due to increasing international FIA standards.

Categories and marques
During its history, the race has been conducted for production saloon cars, Group E Series Production Touring Cars, Group C Touring Cars, Group A Touring Cars, Group 3A Touring Cars, Super Touring and currently Supercars. Until 1995, more than one class competed in each event. In its early years, the Bathurst 500/1000 was generally a stand-alone event, occasionally becoming a round of a national series such as the Australian Manufacturers' Championship, but never part of the most significant touring car series in Australia, the Australian Touring Car Championship. Since 1999, the race has been run exclusively for the Supercars category, and is run for championship points. In 1999 and 2000, it was the final round of the championship and decided the championship winner on each occasion.  The race was once again the final round of the season in 2020, with the re-organised season having been cut short due to the COVID-19 pandemic, though the championship had already been decided on points.

Many marques, including Morris, Jaguar, Nissan, BMW and Volvo, have competed in and won the event in Bathurst. However, the race is best known for the presence of the traditional rivals of Australian motorsport, Ford and Holden, who have won all but six of the races at Bathurst. Due to the size of the Ford and Holden rivalry, for 1995 to 1996, for the 1997 and 1998 Australia 1000 races and from 1999 to 2012, Group 3A and later V8 Supercars rules mandated that only Fords and Holdens were allowed to compete in the race, using their Falcon and Commodore models respectively. In 2013, V8 Supercars' rules changed and other marques began to enter the race, including the return of past winners Nissan. Holden has the most overall victories with 34, with Ford next best on 21 and Nissan the only other multiple winner with two.

Race history

Phillip Island

The race was originally known as the Armstrong 500. It was first held on 20 November 1960 on the Phillip Island Grand Prix Circuit in Phillip Island, Victoria, over a  distance. The race was claimed by the organisers, the Light Car Club of Australia, to be 'the world's premier production saloon car race'. The intention was to determine which cars had the best combination of performance and reliability in five classes based on engine capacity. It was also a showcase for the Armstrong company to promote its shock absorbers and related products.  Entry was limited to standard, unmodified production saloons built or assembled in Australia. All cars had to complete the first 100 miles without stopping for fuel, oil or a driver change. Any mechanical problems in that time had to be attended to by the driver with no assistance, using only the tools that came with the car. There was no official outright winner, only class winners. Frank Coad and John Roxburgh in a Vauxhall Cresta, were the first to complete the 500-mile race distance. It was the only Vauxhall in a field of 45 cars that included N.S.U.s, Simcas, Peugeots, Morris, Austins, Fords and Standard Vanguards.

The race was held twice more at Phillip Island. In 1961 Bob Jane and Harry Firth, sharing an Australian assembled Mercedes-Benz 220 SE, were the first drivers to complete the 167 laps. They were over a lap clear of the Studebaker Lark driven by David McKay and Brian Foley, which in turn was a lap in front of the Vauxhall Velox of Frank Coad and John Roxburgh. Class wins were achieved by Studebaker, Mercedes-Benz, Peugeot and Renault. In 1962 the class structure changed to one based on price. Jane and Firth switched to a Falcon and once again completed the 500 miles first. Class honours went to Studebaker, Ford, Renault and Volkswagen.

In those days the Phillip Island track was surfaced with a "cold mix" bitumen which could not stand up to the pounding of dozens of race cars going flat out for 500 miles. The track surface broke up and became unsafe during races.

Early years in Bathurst

In 1963 the Armstrong 500 moved to the  Mount Panorama Circuit at Bathurst in New South Wales. The Bathurst 500 was organised and promoted by a consortium of the Seven Network, the Australian Racing Drivers Club (ARDC) and Bathurst Regional Council, an arrangement which would continue until 1998. Its popularity grew rapidly, chiefly because it became a means for car manufacturers to showcase their products as the race cars had to be identical to those available on the showroom floor. The first years on the Mount Panorama circuit were dominated by swift and agile small cars, such as the Ford Cortina and Mini Cooper. The class structure was retained so that there were many "races within the race" but the emphasis on achieving first outright increased. In 1963, Bob Jane and Harry Firth again triumphed, this time in a Cortina GT. In 1964 the pair drove competing Cortina GTs; Jane won with George Reynolds as co-driver. Barry 'Bo' Seton was second with Herb Taylor. Harry Firth was third with John Reaburn.

The Confederation of Australian Motor Sport introduced new Group E Series Production Touring Car regulations in 1965 but the Armstrong 500 continued with its own regulations.

1965 brought victory for the first overt "Bathurst Special", the Cortina GT 500. Bo Seton and Midge Bosworth completed the 130 laps first. Bruce McPhee and Barry Mulholland were second in an identical car. Third outright and first in Class C were Brian Foley and Peter Manton in a Morris Cooper S. The Geoghegan brothers, Ian and Leo, famously drove the race wearing business suits supplied by McDowells.

In 1966 and 1967 an Irish tobacco company sponsored the race, which became known as the "Gallaher 500". 1966 was the last four cylinder victory for more than two decades. Rauno Aaltonen and Bob Holden drove their Mini Cooper S to a hard-fought win against stiff competition which mainly consisted of other Coopers. Mini Coopers filled the first nine places in Class C and outright. Class D was won by a Chrysler VC Valiant V8 that completed 124 laps. Class A was won by the Nissan Factory backed Datsun 1300 of Moto Kitamo and Kunimitsu Takahashi. Class B was taken out by an 1100cc version of the Mini Cooper.

1967 rule changes mandated a minimum number of pit-stops to negate the advantage economical smaller cars had of requiring fewer stops. This change favoured the larger, thirstier Fords and Holdens. The Minis handled the corners well and could, theoretically, run the entire race on a single tank of petrol, but the larger-engined cars were faster in a straight line. Ford's development of the 289 cubic inch V8 Ford Falcon GT signalled the end of small cars as outright contenders. 1967 was also the first year that starting grid positions were allocated according to practice lap times rather than by class groupings. This was also the first year that an official trophy was awarded to the first team to cover the 500 miles.

The 1967 victory of the XR Falcon GT over the smaller Alfa Romeo 1600 GTVs and Mini Coopers surprised many pundits as the Falcon GT was unproven. The highly regarded, and more expensive, Alfa GTV had been seen as the emerging force in touring cars. However, the Falcon GT's V8 power was well suited to the Mount Panorama circuit, particularly on the long straights. Thus was forged the adage that "there is no substitute for cubic inches", which became synonymous with racing at Bathurst. Initially the Geoghegan brothers' Falcon was awarded victory but some hours later Harry Firth and Fred Gibson were declared winners. During the race the Geoghegan car had entered the pit area through the rear access lane off Mountain Straight and erroneously accumulated an extra lap on the ARDC timing board. Third place in Class D fell to the venerable Studebaker Lark of Warren Weldon and John Hall. Class E was won by Doug Chivas and Max Stewart in an Alfa GTV. Classes B and C were won by variants of the Mini and Class A was won by a Datsun 1000 piloted by John Roxburgh and Doug Whiteford.

The popularity of the race grew rapidly during the 1960s. Most Australian manufacturers and assemblers became heavily involved. A good result in the long and tough race added credibility to the car and its brand, especially in terms of performance, durability and reliability. An outright or class victory was a significant opportunity to increase sales and market share. It was during this period that the famous Holden-Ford-Chrysler rivalry originated. The production car battle between the "Big Three" was fought at Bathurst. This rivalry spawned Australia's most famous muscle cars, reverentially known as "Bathurst Specials". Ford's Falcon GT and later GT-HO, Holden's Monaro and Torana, and Chrysler's Pacer and Charger models were the result of constant development of race-worthy cars that the general public could buy.

In 1968, sponsorship changed again and the race became known as the Hardie-Ferodo 500. It was also the year that advertising was first allowed to be displayed on the cars. In response to Ford's 1967 Bathurst victory, Holden entered the Monaro GTS 327. This was a coupe based on the HK model four-door Kingswood family sedan. Engineered as an affordable personal luxury car with the ability to win Bathurst it had a 327 cubic inch Chevrolet V8 (as the "GTS 327" name implies). This engine enabled the Monaro GTS 327 to outperform the updated, yet smaller-engined, 302 cubic inch Falcon GTs and win in 1968. This was Holden's first Bathurst 500 win.

The 1969 Hardie-Ferodo 500 saw the first of the Ford Falcon GT-HOs. This Phase One GT-HO Bathurst special Falcon was powered by a 351 cubic inch V8 sourced from Ford America. Its 'HO' specification included upgraded suspension components such as front and rear stabiliser bars. At Bathurst it was fitted with race tyres. Holden upgraded the GTS 327 Monaro to the GTS 350, which included better race-style handling and a more powerful Chevrolet V8 engine of 350 cubic inches. The new GTS 350 Monaro, in the hands of Colin Bond and Tony Roberts, was able to hold out Ford to claim the second victory for Holden. In 1969 there was a multi-car accident on lap one. After the first 10 cars passed through The Esses, contact between two Falcons caused one to roll over. Several cars coming around the blind corner crashed into the stationary car. The track was almost blocked with wreckage but expert flag marshalling enabled the cars to pass through in single file until the debris was cleared. The race was a disaster for Ford as many Falcon tyres failed due to the speed and weight of the Falcons. Ford even a ran a post race advertising campaign using the slogan "we were a little deflated".

The 1969 race also saw the début of Peter Brock. Brock and Bond were drivers for the semi-official Holden Dealer Team (HDT), which had been formed earlier in the year to counter the official Ford Special Vehicles division that was churning out ever evolving GT-HO Falcons. The "Old Fox", Harry Firth, who had been in charge of the Ford racing effort until he was abruptly replaced by an American, Al Turner, took charge of the HDT.

1970 saw a change of strategy as Holden chose to race the smaller Torana GTR XU-1 rather than the Monaro. The XU-1 was a special "Bathurst" version of the six-cylinder LC Torana. As the embryonic HQ Holden required too much development to be competitive Holden created an alternative to the V8 muscle car. The XU-1 was more agile, cheaper and more economical. Triple carburettors on the "Red" motor provided an excellent power-to-weight ratio. The XU-1 was easier on brakes and tyres, thereby minimizing the number of required pit stops. However, Ford refined the GT-HO to Phase Two specification with an even more powerful and better breathing 351 V8. With tyres that were able to endure the power and torque, the GT-HO reinforced the adage that "there is no substitute for cubic inches". Allan Moffat's GTHO received the chequered flag followed by Bruce McPhee's identical car. The Torana could not compensate for the power advantage that the Falcons had on the Bathurst straights.

Rule changes for 1970 enabled a single driver to complete the entire race distance. To reduce the chances of another first lap calamity the starting grid was changed from 2-3-2 to a staggered 2-2-2 formation. This meant that the back markers had to start the race from around the corner on Conrod Straight. The race continued to be run to unique regulations which were more restrictive than those which were applied to Series Production racing.

1971 was another Ford victory with Moffat at the wheel. It was won by the ultimate GT-HO, the XY-model Falcon GT-HO Phase Three. This featured upgrades to engine power and aerodynamics, which made it one of the world's fastest four-door mass-produced production cars. Chrysler replaced its Pacers with its new two-door, the Charger. However, by noon on race day, Moffat was far enough in front to pit without losing the lead. Moffat completed the 500 miles first followed by other GTHOs in second and third place and filling six of the top seven places. Class wins were achieved by Mazda 1300, Datsun 1600, Mazda RX-2, Torana XU1 and Falcon GTHO.

1972 saw controversy, following a media-driven "Supercar Scare", which had accumulated enough political momentum to force Holden to postpone introduction of a V8 Torana for two years. Ford abandoned the XA model based Phase Four GT-HO Falcon. Chrysler also followed by not going ahead with a competition version of its V8-powered Charger. Adding to that, the 1972 Hardie-Ferodo 500 was the first Bathurst 500 to be run in wet weather. Allan Moffat was unable to withstand the immense pressure placed on him by Brock in his XU-1. The Torana proved more than a match in the atrocious conditions. After being challenged by Brock's furiously driven XU-1, Moffat was unable to exploit the V8's power advantage and spun early in the race. He also incurred two one-minute penalties for starting the engine while refuelling. Brock, meanwhile, was able to hold off the Phase Three GT-HO of John French and the E49 Charger of Doug Chivas to win the 1972 race, thus temporarily refuting the "no substitute for cubic inches" adage. Brock had pushed the car to its limits in a spectacular display of car control. It was a significant victory for a number of reasons: The first of Brock's nine Bathurst wins which later led to him being nicknamed the "King of the Mountain" and "Peter Perfect". Brock's win also signalled the first Bathurst victory for a six-cylinder engined car, an achievement that would not be repeated until 1991 when the Nissan Skyline GT-R "Godzilla" took the chequered flag. It was also the birth of the Torana legend as this uniquely Australian performance car went on to become one of Australia's most successful touring cars, due in part to numerical supremacy on the track and the withdrawal of Ford and Chrysler from motor racing later in the seventies.

1972 was also the last year that drivers were permitted to drive without co-drivers.

The 1972 race was a round of the 1972 Australian Manufacturers' Championship, which was open to Group E Series Production Touring Cars.

Group C Era
The race was extended from 500 miles to 1000 kilometres in 1973. The increased pace of the cars had resulted in the 500-mile race distance being achieved earlier each year, and since Australia had converted to the metric system the increased distance was considered more appropriate than 800 km for an endurance race. To reduce the threat to public safety, homologation rules were relaxed to permit certain modifications to the race cars. Ostensibly this removed the need to build batches of high speed road cars and improved the durability of the actual race cars. The Group E Series Production Touring Car regulations, which had applied to the 1972 race, were replaced by the new Group C Touring Car regulations for 1973. Upgrades were allowed to seats, lubrication systems, camshafts, carburettors, suspensions, brakes and wheel rim sizes. These changes advantaged the better resourced teams as a great deal of testing was now needed to optimize the performance of the race cars. Factory teams had the best access to improved components that were often not readily available to private competitors.

In 1973 Holden campaigned upgraded XU-1s. Privateers entered improved Chargers. Ford unleashed its new XA model "hard top" coupe Ford Falcon GT which had been pioneered by John Goss. While not designated as a GT-HO, race prepared Hardtop GTs incorporated most of the still born Phase Four's componentry including the four-bolt 351 V8 engine. The 1973 Hardie-Ferodo 1000 started at 9:30 am. When the flag dropped the "no substitute for cubic inches" ethic prevailed as the Goss Falcon hardtop powered away from pole position. At the end of lap one Fords held the first four places with Toranas fifth, six and seventh. The highest placed Charger was in eighth position. Brock inherited the lead when the Fords started pitting for fuel. Brock and co-driver Chivas had contrived a good lead when a miscalculation caused the Torana to run out of fuel at the top of the Mountain. Intending to perform one less pit stop than the Ford teams, HDT team manager Harry Firth had instructed Chivas to "Get Max Laps" via a hand held sign. The XU-1 coasted down Conrod Straight and came to a halt just before the entrance to the Pits. Chivas pushed the XU-1 up hill along pit lane. His pit crew could not lend assistance as this would have resulted in disqualification. By the time the XU-1 was refueled, Moffat was well in front. Brock set off in heroic pursuit of Moffat's Falcon GT but the XU-1 suffered a deflating tyre. Moffat claimed another Falcon victory, his third in only four years. Co-driven by Ian (Pete) Geoghegan the winning Ford was the only Falcon classified as a finisher.  1973 was the last competitive appearance for Chrysler, with the marque disappearing from the Group C category almost entirely. Class wins were achieved by a Datsun 1200, an Alfa GTV, a Mazda RX2 and, of course, the Falcon GT. At the end of the year Ford Australia gave the Falcon GT race cars to their drivers and withdrew from racing.

During the 1974 Australian Touring Car Championship the Torana GTR XU-1 was gradually superseded by the wider bodied SL/R 5000. The Holden Bathurst contingent for this year included 13 SL/R 5000s, 7 XU-1s and one HQ Monaro GTS. Ford was represented in the outright category by three Falcon Hardtop headed by Moffat's Brut 33 XB Falcon Hardtop GT. He was supported by John Goss and Kevin Bartlett in an XA Hardtop and Murray Carter in another XB Falcon Hardtop. The V8 Toranas ran away at the start of the 1974 race and Holden victory seemed assured. By lap 11 Brock had already lapped 7 of the outright Class D cars. On lap 12 Moffat pitted and lost several laps as a new coil was fitted. By lap 20 the HDT Toranas of Brock and Bond were over a minute in front of Goss in the only competitive Falcon. By lap 85 the two HDT Toranas were four laps clear of the field. Around the 90 lap mark rain started to fall at the top of the mountain. The HDT Toranas soon pitted for wet weather tyres after which the Bond Torana started smoking from an oil leak. The car was eventually black flagged. While the mechanics were trying to fix the problem Brock pitted with a broken piston caused by a failed oil pump. Bond returned to the track but lost more time with a spin. Despite determined driving from Jim Richards and Wayne Negus, The Goss/Bartlett car was able to gain a slight lead as the Torana challenge faded amidst oil smoke and torrential rain. Bartlett completed the 163 laps in first place. The only other car on the same lap was the Forbes/Negus SL/R 5000. The smaller classes were won by a Morris Cooper S, an Alfa GTV and a Mazda RX3. Car number 34, a lone Morris Marina finished 6th in Class C having completed 125 laps.

Holden's 308 cubic inch V8-powered Toranas scored Bathurst victories in 1975, 1976, 1978 and 1979 in L34 and A9X configuration. Ford's 351 XC Falcon famously finished first and second in 1977. On the final lap, the two Moffat Ford Dealers entries of Allan Moffat and Colin Bond ran in formation down Conrod Straight, with the helicopter footage of the formation becoming one of the most famous images in Bathurst 1000 history. This was Moffat's last Bathurst 1000 victory. Group C carried over into the 1980s. Holden and Ford were the only manufacturers to win under these regulations, despite facing increased imported competition, notably from the Mazda RX-7 that was campaigned effectively by Moffat and Kevin Bartlett's 350 V8 powered Chevrolet Camaro. The turbo powered Nissan Bluebird piloted by George Fury also threatened the V8 'Big Bangers' and signalled a sign of things to come during the Group A era. Peter Brock cemented his reputation as the driver to beat during this period, including achieving two Bathurst hat-tricks with the Marlboro-sponsored HDT. In 1978 and 1979 he and Jim Richards drove an A9X Torana to victory, while in 1980 the pair won in a VC Commodore. His second hat trick consisted of victories in 1982, 1983 and 1984, this time partnering with Larry Perkins in a VH Commodore for the first two years and in a VK Commodore in the third. In 1983, John Harvey also shared the win with Brock and Perkins. Dick Johnson was the only winner for Ford during the 1980s under Group C, with a victory in 1981 whilst at the wheel of the XD Falcon. It was a famous win, coming twelve months after writing his car off in an incident with a rock in 1980. It also followed a large public fundraising campaign to provide him with the finances to build a new car, which eventually raised AU$144,000, half of which came from Ford Australia itself. Group C was replaced by the International Group A Touring car rules in 1985, with selected cars preparing for this change and competing in a separate "Group A" class in 1984.

Group A Era
From 1985 to 1992, the Bathurst 1000 was run to international Group A regulations. Imported turbocharged cars, initially Ford Sierra RS Cosworths and then Nissan Skyline GT-Rs, achieved dominance during this period while Holden Commodores managed to claim three hard-fought wins. The JPS Team BMW run 635 CSis and M3s were also highly competitive during this era. Group A enabled Australian teams to develop cars that could be raced overseas. Locally built cars were driven in Europe by Allan Grice, Peter Brock, John Harvey, Allan Moffat, Dick Johnson and John Bowe. Tom Walkinshaw also briefly campaigned VL Commodores in Europe.

Holden based race teams continued development of the 308 cubic inch V8 powered Commodore. The HDT and later the Holden Racing Team (HRT) were at the forefront of Commodore development. With almost no support from Ford Australia, Group A Ford Falcons never eventuated. Dick Johnson Racing switched to a 1983 Zakspeed developed Ford Mustang GT formerly raced in Europe by German ace Klaus Ludwig. Johnson and co-driver Larry Perkins were very competitive in the agile Mustang but it lacked top end power. Ford teams went on to adopt the more powerful, though less reliable, Ford Sierra Turbo Cosworth. These were available race ready from Europe and were campaigned by many teams including Allan Moffat Racing, Dick Johnson Racing and eventually a team run by Holden stalwart Peter Brock.

1985 was the first year that the Bathurst 1000 was run under Group A rules. The race was dominated by Tom Walkinshaw Racing's three car Jaguar XJ-S team, the big V12 powered Jaguars having a clear power and speed advantage over the still developing Australian Group A teams and cars. 1974 winner John Goss, and West German driver Armin Hahne claimed Jaguar's only Bathurst 1000 win. The following year, 1986, the Holden VK Commodore SS Group A of privateer racer Allan Grice and Graeme Bailey took the honours. Grice had honed his skills in Europe, competing alongside compatriot Commodore drivers Peter Brock and his newly recruited HDT teammate, Allan Moffat.

1986 saw the race's first fatality. Consequent to Burgmann's death the circuit was altered prior to the 1987 race by the incorporation of "The Chase" two-thirds of the way down Conrod Straight. As a result of "The Chase", lap times around the circuit increased by approximately 4–5 seconds (based on times in comparable cars from the 1986 and 1987 races).

In 1987, the Bathurst 1000 became a round of the short lived 1987 World Touring Car Championship, resulting in European teams racing against local Australian teams in the 1000. The resulting culture clash caused considerable angst between officials and team management. Since the start of Group A in Australia, CAMS local scrutineers diligently applied the Group A regulations as written. The global organising body FISA, a subsidiary of the Fédération Internationale de l'Automobile (FIA), allowed more liberal, negotiated interpretations "back home". Some European teams, most prominently the Ford Europe backed Eggenberger Motorsport, ran questionable vehicles. With the race complete, it was still unclear as to who was the legitimate winner. Eggenberger's cars finished first and second on the road but were disqualified months later due to bodywork irregularities. The race win was therefore awarded to third placed Peter Brock, who drove two of his Holden VL Commodore SS Group A cars during the race. Brock broke his '05' HDT Commodore early in the event so he and co-driver David Parsons took over the team's second car, the #10 Commodore of Peter McLeod, to cross the line third behind the two Sierras. It was to be Brock's ninth and final Bathurst 1000 win.

Local Sierra teams dominated and won the next two Bathurst 1000s. 1988 saw Tony Longhurst and Tomas Mezera win in their Frank Gardner-prepared, RS500. In the 1989 race Peter Brock claimed pole in his record 6th pole at Bathurst and his first for Ford or anything but a Holden. Dick Johnson and John Bowe won a hard-fought race ahead of Allan Moffat Racing's all-German combination of Klaus Niedzwiedz and Frank Biela.

In 1990 the Sierras again proved strong, but the HRT Commodore of Allan Grice and Win Percy prevailed. Their Holden VL Commodore SS Group A SV was able to set a fast pace early in the race which the Sierras could match but not sustain due to reliability issues, mostly with tyre wear. The HRT claimed a popular Bathurst victory for Holden after three seasons of Sierra domination.

A fierce new opponent was waiting in the wings. Nissan and team manager Fred Gibson, had campaigned Skylines in Australian competition for a few years. For the 1990 race, they debuted the R32 four-wheel drive, four wheel steer, twin turbo Nissan Skyline GT-R. It initially suffered from the related problems of complexity and reliability but the GT-R went on to dominate Group A racing worldwide. Gibson's lead drivers, Jim Richards and Mark Skaife, easily won the 1991 Bathurst 1000 with Skaife setting the sensational time of 2:12.63 in the Top 10 Runoff for pole which was actually 2/10th faster than George Fury's Group C pole time of 1984 set on the pre-Chase circuit. The pair repeated the win in controversial circumstances in 1992. The car gained the nickname 'Godzilla'. In an attempt to achieve parity between the makes weight penalties (140 kg) and turbo restricting pop-off valves were applied to the Nissan.

The Skyline's 1992 victory was particularly controversial. The parochial Bathurst crowd, and touring car fans in general, had been conditioned to view the Bathurst 1000 as a perpetual struggle between Holden and Ford. Although the Group A racing Commodores and Sierras were far removed from road going examples, the Nissans were seen as being unfairly advantaged and received considerable negative comment in the build-up to the race. Late in the 1992 race, severe rainstorms swept the track, causing several accidents as dry weather tyres caused extreme aquaplaning. During the ensuing mayhem the leading Skyline of Jim Richards and Mark Skaife slid into two wrecked cars. Simultaneously officials red flagged the race due to the perilous condition of the wet track. The surviving cars were marshalled in single file on Pit Straight. Regulation decreed that, as the leaders had completed more than 75% of race distance, the race was not to be restarted.

Under these regulations red flag race results were based on positions held at the end of the last completed lap as there were no official record of the lap not completed. As Richards had been leading the race on that lap his team was declared the winner. This was an unpopular decision with some race fans, many of whom could not understand how a wrecked Nissan could beat a perfectly healthy Sierra that had passed it on the track. As the rain clouds dissipated many unhappy campers loudly voiced their opinions. Race winners Mark Skaife and Jim Richards were challenged by a rowdy, confused and alcohol-fuelled crowd. On the winners' podium the normally affable Richards responded to the boos of the crowd with, "this is bloody disgraceful" and "you're a pack of arseholes" during the nationally televised trophy presentation.

Group 3A and Super Touring
Group A as an international formula faded away in the late 1980s. The Confederation of Australian Motor Sport (CAMS) had planned to replace Group A at the end of 1991. This was postponed to the end of 1992 due to the inability of FISA to specify a new International formula.  As any new regulations were unlikely to suit large engined cars CAMS created a uniquely Australian Touring Car formula for 1993, Group 3A. This iteration evolved into the current Supercars category. Entry became limited to V8 powered Ford Falcons and Holden Commodores (with, in 1993 only, the exception of weight limited normally aspirated Group A cars like the M3s of LoGaMo Racing).

The new regulations created a separate class for 2-litre cars, based on the British Touring Car Championship's (BTCC) regulations of the time. This class excluded turbochargers and four wheel drive, effectively ending the Nissan's GT-R's eligibility. In response Nissan withdrew from Australian motorsport. The two classes of touring cars competed in the same races for two championships in 1993. The 1993 Tooheys 1000 was won by Larry Perkins and Gregg Hansford after a race long duel with the Mark Skaife/Jim Richards Commodore VP. The winner of the 2 Litre Class was the John Cotter/Peter Doulman BMW M3 which had reverted to 2 litres capacity.

In the 1994 season, the 2-litre Super Touring championship was run separately to the ATCC, though both categories ran as two classes at Bathurst. The 1994 Tooheys 1000 was won by the EB Falcon of Dick Johnson and John Bowe. The top placed 2-litre car was the works BMW of Paul Morris and Altfrid Heger which finished 10th outright, albeit six laps behind Johnson and Bowe. In 1995, due to fears about the growing speed difference between the V8s and the 2-litre cars, the Bathurst 1000 became a one-class race for the first time. Just 32 Ford and Holden V8s faced the starter in what was, at the time, the smallest grid in the history of the race. The 1995 champions were Larry Perkins and Russell Ingall in a Holden VR Commodore, followed by Alan Jones and Allan Grice in an EF Falcon. 1996 saw Craig Lowndes and Greg Murphy, in a VR Commodore, cross the finish line ahead the EF Falcon of Dick Johnson and John Bowe. Tony Longhurst and Steven Ellery were third in another EF Falcon.

A race divided
In 1996, the Touring Car Entrants Group of Australia (TEGA) (who had held the rights to market the ATCC since 1994) signed a deal with US sports agent Mark McCormack's International Management Group (IMG) to market the ATCC, which they renamed to V8 Supercars. The new joint venture company (AVESCO) signed a TV deal for 1997 with Network Ten, which included expanded coverage of the championship. This was not an issue for the ATCC races, but for the Bathurst 1000, which was organized and promoted by a consortium that included Channel 7, it was a major issue. Channel 7 had televised the race since 1963 and had a contract that was binding into the 21st century. Seven was not prepared to drop the race, while AVESCO required a Bathurst race for Ten to broadcast. A similar dispute affected the V8 Supercars Challenge support races at the Australian Grand Prix, in which at various times different networks have held the broadcast rights to both V8 Supercars and Formula One.

There was no resolution to the dispute, and AVESCO announced that V8 Supercars would not compete in the traditional Bathurst 1000 held on the October long weekend in 1997. TOCA Australia was invited to fill the void with a 2-litre Super Touring field, featuring a number of British Touring Car Championship drivers and teams, including Alain Menu, John Cleland and Rickard Rydell, joining Australian Super Touring Championship regulars. This 1997 race was won by Paul Morris and Craig Baird in a BMW 320i, however they were later disqualified as Baird had exceeded the mandated time limit for a continuous solo driving period. The race was awarded to their BMW Motorsport Australia teammates David and Geoff Brabham. This event format continued for 1998 with the addition of a field of cars from the New Zealand Touring Car Championship, which ran to Schedule S regulations with a 2.5-litre engine limit, as well as Group E production cars. Alongside Rickard Rydell, Jim Richards won his sixth Bathurst 1000 in a Volvo S40 run by Tom Walkinshaw Racing, with his son Steven second in a Nissan Primera run by British team Team Dynamics.

As well as these races for two-litre cars, separate five-litre (V8 Supercars) races were held in 1997 and 1998, known as the "Australian 1000 Classic". Having received backlash after announcing they would not race at Bathurst, AVESCO hastily made a deal with the Bathurst Regional Council for the use of the circuit. The 1997 Primus 1000 Classic, as it was known, was held two weeks after the traditional race, while the 1998 FAI 1000 was held in mid-November. The 1997 race saw Larry Perkins and Russell Ingall repeat their 1995 triumph, ahead of the father and son combination of Jim and Steven Richards. In 1998, Steven Richards did one better, winning the race with Jason Bright for Stone Brothers Racing. Their Ford EL Falcon was badly damaged in a practice crash and required lengthy repairs before the race.

Both the Super Touring and V8 Supercar races claimed to be the legitimate Bathurst 1000. The V8 Supercars' case was that they were the truly Australian class of racing and, through contractual binding, had the "star" Australian drivers. The Super Touring claim to legitimacy was based on it being held on the traditional date by the ARDC who had run the event every year since 1963. Each of the four races in 1997 and 1998 are considered as legitimate Bathurst 1000s in the record books.

V8 Supercars era
For 1999, the Super Touring event devolved into a 300-kilometre race for mixed V8s, which was won by Peter Brock's step-son James Brock, and a 500-kilometre race for Super Touring won by Paul Morris. This would be the last major Super Touring race at Bathurst, the last organised by the ARDC and the last held on the traditional Labour Day holiday weekend. The demise of Super Touring and the ARDC event allowed V8 Supercars and IMG to take over the promotion and organisation of the Bathurst 1000 brand from that year onwards. From 1999 onwards, the race also counted for championship points for the first time, taking a position as the final round on the calendar.

Despite there no longer being an October Bathurst race in 2000, the race remained in November due to the Sydney Olympics blocking out sport in October. In 2001 when the long weekend became available again, the National Rugby League shifted their Grand Final to that Sunday, denying the Bathurst 1000 a return to its traditional weekend. The race instead moved to the weekend after the long weekend from 2001 onwards, and to an earlier spot in the championship calendar. The start of this new era was dominated by Holden, who won every Bathurst 1000 from 1999 to 2005. In 1999, Steven Richards repeated his 1998 triumph, winning with Greg Murphy in their Gibson Motorsport Holden VT Commodore. Richards became the first driver to win in both a Ford and a Holden in consecutive years. It was also the first win for Gibson Motorsport since their wins with Nissan in 1991 and 1992. Garth Tander and Jason Bargwanna became Bathurst champions in 2000 with Garry Rogers Motorsport.

In 2001, Mark Skaife, driving for the Holden Racing Team, teamed with 1988 winner Tony Longhurst to win the Bathurst 1000 in a Holden VX Commodore. Despite having cooling problems in the closing laps of the 2002 Bathurst 1000, due to plastic bags in the air intake, Skaife and HRT won the Bathurst 1000 again, this time teamed with Jim Richards, ten years after they were both heckled off the podium after winning in 1992. This time, Richards jokingly said that the crowd was "a lovely bunch of people", in contrast to his comments made on the podium ten years earlier. Greg Murphy was given the biggest time penalty (five minutes) in Bathurst history because of a pitlane infringement by his team. His car was released early, rupturing a refuelling hose and spilling fuel in the pit box.

In the Top 10 Shootout in 2003, Greg Murphy set what was then the fastest lap ever on the Mount Panorama Circuit with a time of 2:06.8594, a lap which became known as the "Lap of the Gods". Murphy went on to win the Bathurst 1000 with Rick Kelly in 2003 and 2004 for K-Mart Racing. Rick Kelly became the race's youngest ever winner, winning in 2003 at the age of 20. Todd Kelly, brother to Rick, won the 2005 race on his birthday, winning with Mark Skaife for HRT.

In 2006, Craig Lowndes and Jamie Whincup won the first race for Ford in eight years, driving for Triple Eight Race Engineering. They were also the first winners of the Peter Brock Trophy (so named following the passing of Peter Brock only the month before). Lowndes and Whincup then won the next two races to achieve the first three-peat since Brock and Larry Perkins won the Bathurst 1000 from 1982 to 1984 (the 1983 win was also shared with John Harvey). Holden then started a run of four straight wins from 2009 to 2012. The 2009 race was won by the HRT's Garth Tander and Will Davison. 2009 was also the first race since the championship moved to an E85 fuel blend, which increased fuel consumption and as such led to more pit stops during the race. 2010 saw another win for Lowndes and Triple Eight, this time with Mark Skaife, their fifth and sixth wins respectively. In 2011, Nick Percat became the first rookie to win the Bathurst 1000 since Jacky Ickx in 1977, alongside Garth Tander, with Tander only just holding off Lowndes in a close finish.

With new regulations announced for 2013, the last winners of that iteration of regulations were Jamie Whincup and Paul Dumbrell in 2012, in the hitherto second closest non-formation finish in Bathurst 1000 history, with David Reynolds and Dean Canto finishing 0.31 seconds behind the Triple Eight Holden VE Commodore. The closest non-form finish came just the year before, when Tander and Percat lifted the trophy 0.29secs ahead of Lowndes and Skaife.

The 2013 season saw manufacturers other than Ford and Holden enter the Bathurst 1000 for the first time since 1998, under the New Generation V8 Supercar (originally known as Car of the Future) regulations that were introduced that year. Nissan returned with four Nissan Altimas run by Kelly Racing. Mercedes-Benz returned through Australian GT Championship team Erebus Motorsport with its three Mercedes-Benz E63 AMGs. From 2013, the event became part of the newly formed Pirtek Enduro Cup within the Supercars season, along with the series' other two-driver races, the Sandown 500 and Gold Coast 600. The 2013 race itself was a close finish between Ford's factory team drivers from Ford Performance Racing, Mark Winterbottom and Steven Richards, and Triple Eight Race Engineering's Jamie Whincup and Paul Dumbrell. In 2013 the 1000 km was completed in the record time of six hours, eleven minutes and twenty-seven seconds. This was Ford's first victory since 2008. It was also the first time since 1977 that an overtly Ford factory backed car triumphed.

The 2014 Supercheap Auto Bathurst 1000 saw Volvo return for the first time since 1998, with Garry Rogers Motorsport entering two Volvo S60s. Between the 2013 and 2014 races, the track was resurfaced. This new track surface resulted in a marked reduction of lap times, and during free practice many of the drivers recorded times that were under the existing practice lap record. As with the early Phillip Island races, some of this new surface started to break up early in the race, particularly at Griffin's Bend. Many drivers were caught off guard and ran into the tyre wall due to the debris on the track.

With 100 laps remaining, the officials suspended the race with a red flag, only the third red flag at the race after 1981 and 1992. The cars were then lined up on pit straight, and controversy ensued as teams exploited the regulations and performed repairs on the cars. Once the track repairs were finished the race resumed in single file under the safety car. Racing recommenced shortly after but competition was further interrupted by a number of safety car periods. The race was run to its full distance and finished in the early evening, with Ford Performance Racing drivers Chaz Mostert and Paul Morris taking victory on the final lap, after the lead car of Jamie Whincup and Paul Dumbrell ran low on fuel. Morris and Mostert had started the race from last position after being excluded from qualifying.

In 2015, Chaz Mostert experienced a major reversal of fortunes, with a heavy qualifying crash leaving him with a fractured femur and wrist, and ruling his car out for the weekend. The incident also injured several marshals. On Sunday, after a mid-race rain shower, Craig Lowndes and Steven Richards eventually prevailed for their sixth and fourth wins of the Bathurst 1000 respectively. It was Lowndes' thirteenth podium at the event, which is an all-time record.

Supercars Championship era
The 2016 race, the first under the renamed Supercars Championship banner, featured 91 green laps to start the race, followed by a dramatic and safety car-filled conclusion to proceedings. Most notably, there was a late-race incident between Garth Tander and Scott McLaughlin, retiring the former's car, which occurred as Triple Eight's Jamie Whincup attempted to redress a clash between him and McLaughlin at the Chase. Whincup received a fifteen-second time penalty, which meant that despite taking the chequered flag first, he was only classified 11th. This allowed the Tekno Autosports entry of Will Davison and Jonathon Webb to take victory, only just over one tenth of a second ahead of the sister Triple Eight entry of Shane van Gisbergen and Alexandre Prémat. Following the finish, Triple Eight announced they were appealing the penalty, regarding the appropriateness of a time penalty for such an offence. The appeal, held by the Supercars National Court of Appeal in the County Court of Victoria, was dismissed in a hearing nine days after the race.

The 2017 Supercheap Auto Bathurst 1000 saw another victory for an independent team with Erebus Motorsport prevailing in mostly wet conditions with David Reynolds and Luke Youlden behind the wheel. Erebus also joined Tekno as the only teams to win both the Bathurst 12 Hour and the Bathurst 1000. David Reynolds and Luke Youlden continued their form into the 2018 edition, taking pole and leading the majority of the race until Reynolds suffered from leg cramps late in the race, allowing the 2015-winning combination of Craig Lowndes and Steven Richards to take the lead and the eventual victory. It took Lowndes to seven event wins and Richards to five.

The 2019 race only featured one safety car in the first 101 laps, but the final 60 laps featured seven, eventually resulting in a one lap sprint to the chequered flag. Scott McLaughlin, driving with Alexandre Prémat, held on to win from the Triple Eight entry of Shane van Gisbergen and Garth Tander and in doing so won the first Bathurst 1000 for the Ford Mustang nameplate, the first for Dick Johnson Racing since Team Penske took a stake in the team in 2014 and the first for the team as a whole since 1994. However, the race results remained provisional for a week until a hearing was held into DJR Team Penske's instructions to team-mate Fabian Coulthard during an earlier safety car. The instructions over team radio resulted in Coulthard slowing the field after a safety car was called, which allowed McLaughlin and Jamie Whincup to pit without losing any positions. Despite already being given a drive-through penalty during the race, after the hearing Coulthard was further relegated to the last finisher and the team was docked 300 Teams' Championship points and fined AU$250,000 with $100,000 of the fine suspended. As it could not be proven that the instructions were intended to advantage McLaughlin and Prémat, their race win remained. One month after the race, an investigation into McLaughlin's qualifying engine found a breach, resulting in a further fine, loss of his pole position and qualifying lap record and demotion to last place on the grid for the 2019 Sandown 500.

Because of the COVID-19 pandemic, the 2020 race was held a week later than usual and with a limited number of fans, capped at 4,000 daily. In what was the final event for a factory-backed Holden team before the brand's retirement, the race was won by Shane van Gisbergen and Garth Tander, the latter's fourth Bathurst 1000 win. For the first time since 2000, the event was the final round of the championship, however Scott McLaughlin had already secured an unassailable lead at the penultimate event.

Famous winners
The most successful driver at Bathurst is Peter Brock, whose nine victories (1972, 1975, 1978–80, 1982–84 and 1987) earned him the nickname King of the Mountain.

Bob Jane won the race four times in succession from 1961 to 1964. Jane's racing exploits assisted in the creation of his automotive businesses, originally with automotive vehicle dealerships, then later more prominently with a national chain of tyre retailers, Bob Jane T-Marts. The company became a title sponsor of the race between 2002 and 2004. Three of Jane's wins were with Harry Firth, who went on to win a fourth race in 1967 and also was a team manager for the 1969 and 1972 Holden Dealer Team victories.

New Zealand's Jim Richards won the race seven times (1978–80, 1991–92, 1998 and 2002) and also holds the record for the most starts (35) at this event. Richards' son Steven is also a five-time winner (1998, 1999, 2013, 2015 and 2018). The two other multiple winners from New Zealand are Greg Murphy, who has won the race four times (1996, 1999, 2003 and 2004), and Shane van Gisbergen in 2020 and 2022 respectively.

Craig Lowndes, who was a protégé of Brock, and has followed his path in terms of success and popularity, has won the race seven times. He has won three Bathurst races in a Falcon (2006–08) and four in a Commodore (1996, 2010, 2015 and 2018), and also holds the record for most Bathurst podiums, with fourteen.

Larry Perkins is the equal fourth most successful driver at Bathurst, with six victories (1982–84, 1993, 1995 and 1997). Like Jim Richards, Perkins achieved three of his victories as co-drivers with Brock in consecutive years in the Holden Dealer Team era.

Mark Skaife has also won six times, his first was in 1991, with a Nissan Skyline GT-R. He also won in 1992 in the same car, and in 2001, 2002, 2005 and 2010 in a Holden Commodore.

Garth Tander is a five time winner, all of which with Holdens.

Jamie Whincup, the driver with the most championship titles in ATCC/Supercars history, is a four-time winner of the race. His first three wins were with Craig Lowndes, with his fourth coming in 2012.

Canadian-born Allan Moffat is Ford's most successful Bathurst driver, winning the race four times (1970, 1971, 1973 and 1977). The 1977 race saw Moffat and teammate Colin Bond cross the finish line side by side after opening up an indomitable lead in the early laps.

Dick Johnson first rose to fame during the 1980 race when his privately entered Ford Falcon hit a rock that had fallen (or been pushed; the subject is still debated to this day) onto the track. Thanks to public donations of over A$70,000 – and a matching donation from Ford – Johnson was able to rebuild his car and win the Bathurst race the following year. He went on to win twice more, in 1989 and 1994.

List of winners

Notes:
 – Outright race winner was not officially recognised until 1965. Prior to that official results reflected four or five class races occurring simultaneously rather than a single race. The first car across the finish line has been retrospectively referred to as outright race winner since then.
 – Race was stopped before full race distance.
 – The first and second position finishers were disqualified post race.
 – The first position finisher was disqualified post race.
 – Denotes Australia 1000 races for V8 Supercars category.
 – Race was stopped for over an hour due to the track surface breaking up and requiring repair. Stoppage time is included in final race time.
 - The first position finisher was assessed a post-race time penalty for violating driving standards.
 - This is the first year with the newly added Chase in Conrod Straight.
 - Race record for time elapsed & average speed.

Records and statistics

Multiple winners

By driver

By entrant

By manufacturer

Most pole positions

By driver

By manufacturer

Most starts

Most podiums

Race records

Qualifying records

Driver records

Deaths
In the more than fifty-year history of the event, three drivers have died whilst competing in the Bathurst 1000.

"The Chase", a large three-corner chicane added in 1987 to the straight, was dedicated to Burgmann with a plaque embedded in the concrete barriers.

In 1992,  Formula One World Champion Denny Hulme, after complaining of blurred vision, suffered a heart attack at the wheel of his BMW M3 Evolution whilst travelling along Conrod Straight. After veering into the wall on the left side of the track, his car came to a relatively controlled stop on the opposite side of the course. When marshals reached the scene, Hulme was unconscious and he was pronounced dead at Bathurst Hospital after suffering a second heart attack.

In 1994, Melbourne privateer entrant Don Watson died during practice. His car, a Holden VP Commodore, had a mechanical failure and went straight ahead at the entry to The Chase, hitting a barrier at almost .

Additionally, the 2006 event was marred by the death of New Zealand driver Mark Porter in a Development V8 Supercar Series support race on the Friday of the meeting. Porter had been scheduled to compete in the 1000 as a driver for the Brad Jones Racing team.

Peter Brock Trophy
Peter Brock died weeks before the 2006 race in an accident during the Targa West rally in Western Australia. Following this, Supercars announced that from 2006 onwards, the drivers in the Bathurst 1000 would be racing to win the Peter Brock Trophy. The 2006 event also honoured Brock with special tributes; including the front row of the starting grid being left vacant, all cars bearing an '05' number sticker made famous by Brock, and a champions' lap of honour featuring Brock's past co-drivers parading in cars that Brock won Bathurst with.

The trophy, manufactured by Hardy Brothers, is inscribed with the words "King of the Mountain", a long-time nickname of Brock's. Craig Lowndes, a long time mentee of Brock, has won the trophy a record six times since its inception.

Event sponsors
 1960–65: Armstrong
 1966–67: Gallaher
 1968–87: James Hardie Industries
 1968–80:  Hardie-Ferodo (brakes brand)
 1981–87: James Hardie
 1988–95: Tooheys
 1996–98: AMP
 1997: Primus
 1998–2000: FAI
 2002–04: Bob Jane T-Marts
 2005–20: Supercheap Auto
 2021–present: Genuine Parts Company 
 2021–present:  Repco (ANZ subsidiary of GPC acquired in 2013)

See also

List of Bathurst 1000 vehicles
National Motor Racing Museum – a museum located adjacent to the racing circuit at Murray's Corner, exhibiting racing memorabilia and cars.
Bathurst 12 Hour
Bathurst 24 Hour
Bathurst Motor Festival
 List of Australian Touring Car Championship races

References

External links
The official website for the Supercheap Auto Bathurst 1000
Chequered Flag Motorsport's Virtual Lap of Bathurst

Motorsport in Bathurst, New South Wales
Touring car races
Supercars Championship races
Auto races in Australia
Recurring sporting events established in 1960
Annual sporting events in Australia
1960 establishments in Australia
Endurance motor racing
10 Sport